Moorside High School is a coeducational secondary school located in Werrington, Staffordshire.

History
The school was opened in 1939 under the name Cellarhead County Modern School.

Previously a community school administered by Staffordshire County Council, in April 2021 Moorside High School converted to academy status. The school is now sponsored by the Potteries Educational Trust.

The school was the subject of a report in the local press in 2022 claiming that it had instituted draconian uniform rules and was isolating many pupils for minor infringements.

Inspection results

Source

References

Secondary schools in Staffordshire
Academies in Staffordshire